Scopula conspicillaria is a moth of the  family Geometridae. It is found in Equatorial Guinea (Bioko).

References

Moths described in 2001
conspicillaria
Moths of Africa
Fauna of Bioko